Korchmar is a Russian and Ukrainian surname. The Belarusian equivalent is Karchmar. Notable people with the surname include:

Danny Kortchmar (born 1946), American musician
Grigoriy Korchmar (born 1947), Russian composer and pianist, brother of Leonid
Leonid Korchmar (born 1943), Russian conductor

See also
 

Russian-language surnames
Ukrainian-language surnames